Mordellistena vadoni is a species of beetle in the genus Mordellistena of the family Mordellidae. It was described by Píc in 1937.

References

External links
Coleoptera. BugGuide.

Beetles described in 1937
vadoni